The Abilene Trophy is awarded annually to the community in Air Mobility Command that is most supportive of its local Air Force Base.

Formally known as the Air Mobility Command Community Support Award, it has been awarded since its establishment in 1998.  The award's sponsor is the Abilene, Texas Chamber of Commerce.  (Abilene is home to Dyess Air Force Base, which has an AMC contingent, the 317th Airlift Group; however, the host unit for Dyess AFB, the 7th Bomb Wing, is under the Air Force Global Strike Command, and thus Dyess AFB and its host community of Abilene would not be eligible for an award sponsored by its host city.)

See also
Air Mobility Command

External links
Source
Abilene Chamber of Commerce
Notes
1. Wichita Metro Chamber of Commerce Wins Abilene Trophy - http://www.18af.amc.af.mil/News/Article-Display/Article/1166863/wichita-metro-chamber-of-commerce-wins-abilene-trophy/

2. Dover wins Abilene Trophy - https://web.archive.org/web/20110719083801/http://www.amc.af.mil/news/story.asp?id=123141566

3. Charleston community wins Abilene Trophy for base support - https://web.archive.org/web/20110719083902/http://www.amc.af.mil/news/story.asp?storyID=123092761

4. Abilene delivery - https://web.archive.org/web/20110719083931/http://www.amc.af.mil/news/story_print.asp?id=123054434

5. Little Rock AFB Community Council wins Abilene Trophy - https://web.archive.org/web/20100612042127/http://www.af.mil/news/story.asp?id=123199441

6. St. Louis Region captures Abilene Trophy - http://www.amc.af.mil/news/story.asp?id=123339823

7. Spokane awarded Air Mobility Command Abilene Trophy 2013 - https://web.archive.org/web/20140514212848/http://www.amc.af.mil/news/story.asp?id=123410066

Awards established in 1998
Awards and decorations of the United States Air Force
1998 establishments in the United States